Bryn is a Welsh word meaning hill. It may also refer to:

Places

United Kingdom
See also UK location

England
 Bryn, Greater Manchester
 Bryn (ward), an electoral ward in Wigan
 Bryn railway station
 Cornwall

Wales
 Bryn, an electoral division of Conwy County Borough Council
 Bryn, Llanelli in Carmarthenshire
 Bryn, Neath Port Talbot
 The Bryn, a village in Monmouthshire

Elsewhere
 Bryn, Akershus, Bærum, Norway
 Bryn, Oslo, Norway
 Bryn Station
 Bryn, Ukraine, a village in Ivano-Frankivsk Oblast, Ukraine

Other uses
 Bryn (given name), includes a list of people with the given name
 Bryn (surname), includes a list of people with the surname
 Bryn, a 2003 album by Welsh bass-baritone Bryn Terfel
 "Bryn", a 2008 song by Vampire Weekend from Vampire Weekend

See also
 Bryn Athyn, Pennsylvania, U.S.
 Bryn Mawr, Pennsylvania, U.S.
 Brin (disambiguation)
 Bryne (disambiguation)
 Brynn (disambiguation)

Welsh masculine given names 
Welsh feminine given names
English-language unisex given names
Welsh unisex given names